James W. Davis (December 18, 1941 – December 27, 2018) was an American professional basketball player who played eight seasons in the National Basketball Association (NBA).

A 6'9" center from the University of Colorado, Davis played in the National Basketball Association from 1967 to 1975 as a member of the St. Louis/Atlanta Hawks, Houston Rockets, and Detroit Pistons. He averaged 6.7 points and 5.2 rebounds in his NBA career.

Davis died of complications from cancer on December 27, 2018, at age 77.

References

1941 births
2018 deaths
American men's basketball players
Atlanta Hawks players
Basketball players from Indiana
Centers (basketball)
Colorado Buffaloes men's basketball players
Deaths from cancer in Ontario
Detroit Pistons draft picks
Detroit Pistons players
Houston Rockets players
Sportspeople from Muncie, Indiana
St. Louis Hawks players
Sunbury Mercuries players